Jai Bir Rai is a Bhutanese politician who has been Minister for Education since November 2018. He has been a member of the National Assembly of Bhutan, since October 2018.

Early life and education

He graduated from the Maastricht School of Management, the Netherlands, and received a degree of MBA (Research program, specialized in Accounting and Finance).

Professional career
Before joining politics in 2013, he served as a CEO, chief consultant, trainer and was also the finance officer of the Royal University of Bhutan, JDWNRH and the Ministry of Agriculture.

Political career
Rai is a member of Druk Nyamrup Tshogpa (DNT). He was elected to the National Assembly of Bhutan in the 2018 elections for the Phuentsholing constituency. He received 5,586 votes and defeated Tashi, a candidate of Druk Phuensum Tshogpa.

On 3 November, Lotay Tshering formally announced his cabinet structure and Rai was named as Minister for Education. On 7 November 2018, he was sworn in as Minister for Education in the cabinet of Prime Minister Lotay Tshering.

References 

Living people
Bhutanese politicians
1973 births
Bhutanese MNAs 2018–2023
Lotay Tshering ministry
Druk Nyamrup Tshogpa politicians
Druk Nyamrup Tshogpa MNAs
Bhutanese people of Nepalese descent
Rai people